Mark James Hudson (born 10 July 1963, in Roade) is a British archaeologist interested in multicultural Japan.  His initial areas of specialization were the Jōmon period and the Yayoi period. His later research has focused on areas of Japan outside state control, primarily islands and mountains. He excavated the Nagabaka site on Miyako Island.

Education
Hudson was educated at Northampton School for Boys and the School of Oriental and African Studies, University of London (BA, 1986). He was awarded his M.Phil in East Asian Archaeology at the University of Cambridge in 1988.  He earned his Ph.D. at the Australian National University in 1996.  His doctoral dissertation began with an investigation of the Jōmon-Yayoi transition in the Kanto region. but extended to a broader consideration of ethnogenesis in ancient Japan.

Career
Hudson was a Professor of Anthropology at Nishikyushu University until 2016.  He previously taught at Okayama University and the University of Tsukuba.  From 2016 to 2018 he was Professor at the Shizuoka Mt. Fuji World Heritage Centre but left citing issues of academic harassment from Shizuoka Prefecture. He is currently a Visiting Professor at the Max Planck Institute for the Science of Human History  and a Research Associate of the Institute of East Asian Studies, ENS de Lyon. He is a member of the editorial boards of the Journal of Occupational Science, Archaeological Research in Asia, and Asian Studies.

Selected works
In a statistical overview derived from writings by and about Mark Hudson, OCLC/WorldCat encompasses roughly 6 works in 10 publications in 1 language and 800+ library holdings.

Books
 Multicultural Japan: Palaeolithic to Postmodern (Cambridge University Press, 1996) (co-editor with Donald Denoon, Gavan McCormack and Tessa Morris-Suzuki)
 
  (co-editor)

Journals

Honors
 Association for Asian Studies, John Whitney Hall Book Prize, 2004.

Notes

Historians of Japan
British Japanologists
Living people
1963 births
Alumni of the University of Cambridge
Australian National University alumni